Dramatization or dramatisation may refer to:
 Adaptation (arts), transfer of a work of art from one medium to another
 Reenactment (disambiguation)

See also
 Drama
 Melodrama